Killing Floor is the debut novel by Lee Child, first published in 1997 by Putnam. The book won the Anthony Award and Barry Award for best first novel. It is also the first book to feature the character Jack Reacher. It is written in the first person.

The novel has three prequels: The Enemy (set eight years before Killing Floor and published in 2004), Night School (set one year before Killing Floor; published in 2016), The Affair (set six months before Killing Floor; published in 2011).

Plot summary
Jack Reacher gets off a Greyhound bus in the town of Margrave, Georgia, because he remembers his brother mentioning that a blues musician named Blind Blake had died there. Much to his surprise, shortly after his arrival, he is arrested in a local diner for murder on the orders of the sheriff, Morrison, who falsely claims he saw Reacher leave the scene.

While in custody, Reacher meets Finlay, the chief of detectives, and Roscoe, a female officer who believes him to be innocent. Reacher persuades Finlay to call a number on a piece of paper found in the dead man's shoe; the number leads them to Paul Hubble, a retired banker who instantly confesses to the murder. Before Reacher can be released, he and Hubble are transferred to a state prison in Warburton, where Reacher manages to thwart an attempt on their lives by the Aryan Brotherhood. Suspecting that the deputy warden set them up, Reacher joins Finlay's investigation, while Hubble is presumed dead after vanishing from his house in the middle of the day.

Reacher learns that the murdered man is his brother, Joe, who was running an investigation into a counterfeiting ring operated by the Kliner family under the protection of Morrison, several dirty cops, and the corrupt mayor, Grover Teale. A second body, belonging to truck driver Sherman Stoller, is found, and Morrison and his wife are brutally murdered shortly thereafter. Roscoe theorizes that the Kliners are using Margrave as a distribution hub for their counterfeit money, but this is eventually disproven when Reacher searches one of their trucks and finds it empty. He then realizes that the opposite is true: the Kliners have been hoarding the money in response to a Coast Guard operation cutting off their supply of bills from Venezuela, and plan to resume distribution once the operation is shut down as a cost-saving measure.

Sending Hubble's family into hiding to protect them from Kliner, Reacher kills Kliner’s son and several other associates after luring them into an ambush. He then informs Finlay of the secret behind Kliner's operation, which his brother had been trying to prove: to obtain the special paper required to make undetectable forgeries, the criminals had employed Hubble to collect hundreds of thousands of used $1 bills and send them to ports in Florida  through Stoller and other drivers, whereupon they would be bleached in Venezuela to remove the ink and then used to make forged $100 bills. However, when they return to Margrave, they are taken captive by Kliner, Teale, and Finlay's FBI contact Picard, who reveals that he has been keeping track of their progress, and has Roscoe and Hubble's family in his custody. Kliner reveals that Hubble isn't dead, but in hiding, and threatens to kill his hostages unless Reacher finds him.

En route, Reacher stages a distraction and kills Picard's escorts, before apparently shooting him dead. He then locates Hubble in a nearby motel, and brings him back to Margrave. Finding the criminals gone, they spring Finlay from captivity in the police station and set it on fire, before locating the hostages at Kliner's warehouse. Reacher kills a dirty cop named Baker, shoots Teale and Kliner, and sets fire to the rest of their money. A wounded Picard shows up and beats Reacher down, but Finlay distracts him long enough for Reacher to kill him. The group then escapes as the warehouse explodes, and Reacher ends up spending the night with Roscoe. Realizing that his actions will attract a lot of unwanted attention from the authorities, Reacher decides to leave Georgia. Roscoe gives him one last gift: a picture of his brother retrieved from one of Kliner's victims.

Adaptation
The book was developed into the first season of TV series Reacher, produced by Skydance Television, Paramount Television Studios, Blackjack Films and Amazon Studios for Amazon Prime Video.  It premiered in February 2022.

Awards and nominations
 1998 Anthony Award winner, Best First Novel
 1998 Barry Award winner, Best First Novel
 1998 Dilys Award nominee
 1998 Macavity Award nominee, Best First Mystery Novel
 2000 Japan Adventure Fiction Association Prize winner, Best Translated Novel

References

External links
 

1997 British novels
American thriller novels
Jack Reacher books
Novels by Lee Child
Novels set in Georgia (U.S. state)
Anthony Award-winning works
Barry Award-winning works
1997 debut novels
First-person narrative novels
Bantam Press books
G. P. Putnam's Sons books